Hyperprosopon argenteum, the walleye surfperch, is a species of surfperch native to the eastern Pacific Ocean.

Description
The body of the Walleye surfperch is oval and strongly compressed. The head is small and the eyes are large. The mouth is small and slanted downward. Its normal colouration is silver with faint dusky shading on the back, while the tips of the ventral fins, the borders of the anal fin, and the tail fin are black. The Walleye surfperch can be distinguished from other surfperch by the distinctive black tips on the ventral fins and black borders on the tail and anal fins. This species can reach a length of  length.

Range
Walleye surfperch are found in the Eastern Pacific Ocean from Vancouver Island, British Columbia, Canada to central Baja California, Mexico, including Guadalupe Island (off northern central Baja California).

Natural history
Walleye surfperch live in the surf on sand beaches and over sand near rocks, they are often found and caught around piers. Mating takes place in October, November and December when the usual dense schools disperse with the males and females pairing off. The approach of another male is immediately countered by a quick charge from the courting male toward the intruder. Between 1 and 19 young, depending on the size of the mother, are born the following spring. They average a little over 1.5 inches in length at birth. They reach maturity the following fall and winter; in fact, the largest proportion of the breeding population appears to be young of the year. Walleyes are probably short-lived as are most other surfperches. A 10.5 inch walleye was only 6 years old. Walleye surfperch often occur in dense schools. They feed on small crustaceans. They are viviparous with the females giving birth to live young. They are an important game fish.

Fishing information
Walleye surfperch can be plentiful, easy to catch and occur in large numbers in surf, shore and pier catches.

References
Froese, R. and Luna, S.D., eds. (2012) Hyperprosopon argenteum 
California Department of Fish and Game (2013) Marine Sportfish Identification: Walleye Surfperch 

argenteum
Fish described in 1854